Christian Anderson Konan (born 12 July 1999) is an Italian professional footballer who plays as a forward for Swiss club Rapperswil-Jona.

Career
After playing for the youth team of Inter Milan, one of Italy's most successful teams, Konan signed for Girondins de Bordeaux in the French Ligue 1, failing to make an appearance there before joining French second division side Clermont Foot, where he again failed to make an appearance.

In 2019, he signed for Panathinaikos, one of Greece's most successful clubs, after helping their reserves finish 2nd at a tournmanent in the Netherlands while on trial.

For the second half of 2019–20 season, Konan was sent on loan to Levadiakos in the Greek second division.

References

External links
 

1999 births
Italian people of Ivorian descent
Sportspeople from Varese
Footballers from Lombardy
Italian footballers
Living people
Association football forwards
Clermont Foot players
Panathinaikos F.C. players
Levadiakos F.C. players
UD Logroñés B players
Étoile Carouge FC players
FC Rapperswil-Jona players
Championnat National 3 players
Super League Greece 2 players
Swiss Promotion League players
Italian expatriate footballers
Expatriate footballers in France
Italian expatriate sportspeople in France
Expatriate footballers in Greece
Italian expatriate sportspeople in Greece
Expatriate footballers in Spain
Italian expatriate sportspeople in Spain
Expatriate footballers in Switzerland
Italian expatriate sportspeople in Switzerland